August 2020 Mogadishu bombing may refer to:

2020 Mogadishu army base bombing
2020 Mogadishu hotel attack